The Poets' Encyclopedia is an English-language poetical anthology, covering the literary, art and music worlds of New York City in the 1970s. 225 poets, artists, musicians and novelists transform the world's basic knowledge. Imagination trumps fact. John Cage writes on mushrooms, Richard Kostelanetz on gimmicks, Jackie Curtis on B-Girls, Pier Paolo Pasolini on reality, Daniel Berrigan on  Israel, Allen Ginsberg on junk mail, Irene Dogmatic on junk food, John Chamberlain on junk sculpture, and William S. Burroughs on heroin. The New York Times said, it "includes Everything (page 82) and Nothing (page 196)." Unmuzzled OX, the publisher of The Poets' Encyclopedia, attempted as a kind of sequel The Poets' Guide to Canada. (Unmuzzled OX is edited in the summers from Kingston, Ontario.) Although George Bowering, Margaret Atwood, Sonja Skarstedt and other prominent Canadian poets wrote articles, the issue devolved into a jokey conversation between New Yorkers, pseudonymous New Yorkers, and the surrealist poet Russell Edson.

Cultural history of New York City
Poetry anthologies
Encyclopedias of literature